Méribel Altiport , is an altiport in Les Allues, a commune in Savoie, France.

References 

External links 

Airports in Auvergne-Rhône-Alpes
Buildings and structures in Savoie
Altiports